Rembrandt is a Dutch given name of Old Dutch and Old High German origin. Variants are Rembrand and Rembrant. An old form was Ragemprand with Ragem, Rem (advice) and prand, brand (sword). In 2014, there were 203 persons with Rembrandt as a given name in the Netherlands.

Men named Rembrandt   
 Rembrandt Bugatti (1884-1916), Italian sculptor
 Rembrandt Frerichs, Dutch jazz pianist
 Rembrandt Harmenszoon van Rijn (1606–1669) in short Rembrandt, Dutch painter, draftsman and graphic artist
 Rembrandt Lockwood (1815-1889), American architect and painter
 Rembrandt Peale (1778–1860), American painter

Fictional
Rembrandt Brown, a character on the American science fiction television series Sliders
Rembrandt, a character on the 1979 Cult American action thriller film The Warriors and the 2005 video game of same name

See also 
 
 
 Rembrandt (disambiguation)

References

Dutch masculine given names
English-language masculine given names
English masculine given names
German masculine given names
Given names
Masculine given names